Rukadi is a village in Kolhapur district of the Indian state of Maharashtra. It is situated near Kolhapur-Sangli Highway about 413 kilometres (250 mi) from Mumbai, 19 km from Kolhapur, 11 km from Hatkanangle, 37 km from Sangli and 11 km from Ichalkaranji. Ex MP of Lok Sabha Balasaheb Mane was from Rukadi.

Panchganga river flows near Rukadi, which provides water to the village for drinking and irrigation.

Demographics 
In 2023, the population is about 32,000.

Infrastructure
KMT(City Bus) and private rickshaws provide road transit.

In December 2016, a new Sewage Treatment Plant was announced for Rukadi.

References

Villages in Kolhapur district